John O'Donnell was born on 4 February 1947 in Warrnambool, Victoria.

Radio career

John's career as an started in Warrnambool at 3YB and since then has worked at 7HO, 4IP, 7EX, 6PR, 2HD, 3XY, 2SM, 3DB, 3UZ, 2Day FM, New FM, 3MP, Magic 693, and Hope 1032 fm Sydney previously known as 2CBA.

TV career

When Countdown (Australian TV series) began on TV in the early 1970s, John O'Donnell hosted the second week as producers searched for the right host. The first week was hosted by Sydney radio Personality Grant Goldman. They finally decided on music guru Molly Meldrum as the show's host.

Music director/program director

1972–75 Programming 3XY Melbourne, 1976–77 Programming 2SM Sydney, 1984–85 Programming 3UZ Melbourne.

In 1993 Management of Easy Music 3MP created a sister radio station to complement 3MP and called it Magic 693, designed to attract an older demographic. John O'Donnell was made Program Manager of this new radio station programming music from the 1940s to the 1960s. At the time 3MP was the number one station in Melbourne appealing to 40- to 54-year-olds.

Unwittingly Magic 693 became so popular the ratings of sister station 3MP declined dramatically as 3MP's listeners flocked to Magic 693, beginning the demise of 3MP.

John programmed Sydney's Christian Music Station Hope 1032 from 2000 to 2014 and Inspire Digital Sydney's Digital Christian Station from 2010 to 2014.

References

External links
Profile at Hope 103.2

Living people
1947 births
Australian radio personalities
People from Warrnambool
People from Sydney